Kew Gardens was a railway station at Kew on the edge of Southport, Merseyside, England, situated north of the A570 between Meols Cop Road and Foul Lane.

History
The line and station were built by the Liverpool, Southport and Preston Junction Railway, opening on 1 November 1887.

Kew Gardens served and was named after a nearby  park and boating lake, which closed around 1930. The station closed to passengers on 26 September 1938, though the line remained open for goods traffic until 21 January 1952. The track was left in place until 1964 for the storage of excursion stock.

The site has since been redeveloped and is now occupied by a retail park.

References

Sources

 Gell, Rob (1986). An Illustrated Survey of Railway Stations Between Southport & Liverpool 1848–1986. Heyday Publishing Company, .

External links 
 Kew Gardens via Disused Stations
 The line and mileages via Railwaycodes

Disused railway stations in the Metropolitan Borough of Sefton
Former Lancashire and Yorkshire Railway stations
Railway stations in Great Britain opened in 1887
Railway stations in Great Britain closed in 1938
Buildings and structures in Southport